Skanes-Monastir airport is a railway station in Monastir, Tunisia.

The station serves Monastir Habib Bourguiba International Airport. Trains from the station run on the electrified, metre-gauge Sahel Metro line and serve Sousse to the north.

The station lies between the Hotels Monastir to the west and Faculty Monastir to the east.

References 

Railway stations in Tunisia